Robert Edward "Bob" Brown (November 12, 1923 – July 28, 2016) was an American professional basketball player.

He played collegiately for the Miami University.

He played for the Providence Steamrollers (1948–49) and Denver Nuggets (1949–50) in the NBA for 82 games.

Brown died on July 28, 2016.

BAA/NBA career statistics

Regular season

References

External links

1923 births
2016 deaths
American men's basketball players
Denver Nuggets (1948–1950) players
Miami RedHawks men's basketball players
Providence Steamrollers players
People from Darke County, Ohio
Forwards (basketball)